Leonardo Rodrigues Condé (born 21 April 1978), known as Léo Condé, is a Brazilian football coach, currently in charge of Vitória.

Career
Born in Piau, Conde has changed to Juiz de Fora with five years of age and began his career as a coach in the Tupi. Then he worked in juniors and professionals of América Mineiro, from 2001 to 2006. Soon after he moved to the Atlético Mineiro, where he worked in basic categories from 2006 to 2009, returning to the Tupi in March 2009 to train the professional team, remaining until June 2010, was when he moved to the Ipatinga.

In 2011, he returned again to the Tupi, where he was until May this exercise resulted in year, when he with the Villa Nova in Serie D. At the end of 2011, has signed a contract with the Nova Iguacu for the dispute of the Campeonato Carioca, where he made good campaign and won the Copa Rio de professionals. If presented in day October 9, 2013 as coach Caldense, pra dispute of the Campeonato Mineiro in 2014, and for four months.

On December 5, 2014 the board of directors of should coach Caldense, announces the second passage of the coach of the new generation to command the team of Pocos de Caldas in Campeonato Mineiro. being undefeated throughout the second game in the end when Atletico Mineiro. the good performance in the state championship, he was named the new manager of Sampaio Corrêa, in Série B.

Honours
Nova Iguaçu
Copa Rio: 2012

CRB
Campeonato Alagoano: 2017

Sampaio Corrêa
Campeonato Maranhense: 2020

References

External links

1978 births
Living people
Sportspeople from Minas Gerais
Brazilian football managers
Campeonato Brasileiro Série B managers
América Futebol Clube (MG) managers
Clube Atlético Mineiro managers
Tupi Football Club managers
Ipatinga Futebol Clube managers
Villa Nova Atlético Clube managers
Nova Iguaçu Futebol Clube managers
Associação Atlética Caldense managers
Sampaio Corrêa Futebol Clube managers
Clube Atlético Bragantino managers
Goiás Esporte Clube managers
Clube de Regatas Brasil managers
Botafogo Futebol Clube (SP) managers
Paysandu Sport Club managers
Esporte Clube São Bento managers
Grêmio Novorizontino managers
Esporte Clube Vitória managers